Hodgesiella quagella is a moth of the family Cosmopterigidae described by Hugo Theodor Christoph in 1887. It is found in Turkmenistan, Uzbekistan and Afghanistan.

Adults are on wing in May.

The larvae feed on Convolvulus fruticosus.

External links
Notes on the Cosmopterigidae (Lepidoptera) of Afghanistan and Jammu & Kashmir, India with descriptions of two new species

Cosmopteriginae